David LaBerge (born 1929) is a neuropsychologist specializing in the attention process and the role of apical dendrites in cognition and consciousness.

Early life and education
David LaBerge was born in St. Louis, Missouri and received his undergraduate degree from the College of Wooster, his MA degree from Claremont University and his PhD degree Stanford University.

Career 
Dr. LaBerge has taught at Indiana University, Bloomington, University of Minnesota, and University of California at Irvine from 1955 until 1997. He was also a member of the adjunct faculty in psychology and biology at Bard College at Simon's Rock from 1997 to 2007 and was a visiting scholar at the University of Washington, Seattle from 2009 - 2011.

Honors 
Distinguished Teaching Award, College of Liberal Arts, University of Minnesota; University of Minnesota Students Association Distinguished Service Award. Fellow, Society of Experimental Psychologists. Fellow AAAS. Fellow American Psychological Association. Fellow, American Psychological Society. Member Society for Neuroscience.

Research 
1. Mathematical models of choice behavior:
A model for neutral elements (1959a, b) provided a way to represent noise elements in the Estes and Burke (1953) choice theory. A recruitment model for choice behavior (1962, 1994) assumes that processing a stimulus involves the recruiting (or accumulation) of elements by alternative response counters until a criterion number is reached and the corresponding response is evoked. Predictive comparisons of two mathematical models of choice: the Counting Model (Accumulator Model) and the Random Walk Model. LaBerge, Journal of Mathematical Psychology (1994).

2. Early experiments of attention in response time experiments:
Stimulus processing is biased by relative frequency of presentation (1964), by incentive value (1967), and by inserting an informative cue into a trial (1970).
3. Studies of automaticity:
Measurement of automatic processing (1973a). A theory of automaticity in reading (1974) with S.J. Samuels. A theory of automaticity in perception (1975).
4. Measuring the spread of attention in visual space (1983, 1989).
5. Shifting attention by sense modality (1973b) and across visual space (1997).
6. Studies of thalamic involvement in selective attention:
A brain scan study of the human pulvinar during sustained selective attention (1990) with Monte Buchsbaum. A neural network simulation study of thalamic circuit operations in selective attention (1992).
7. Development of a test for preparatory attention to location (2000) with Eric Sieroff, and tests of patients (2004, 2005).
8. Development of a cortex-wide circuit theory of attention:
The Triangular Circuit of Attention, (1995, 1997).
9. Development of an apical dendrite theory of cognition, attention, and consciousness.
10. The neural foundation of experience: the role of vibrating neurons. LaBerge, D, Dorrance Publishing Co., (2020)
A series of papers explored the hypothesis that the apical dendrite is not "just another dendrite" but has its own special functions (2001, 2002, 2005, 2006, 2007).
The hypothesis that the apical dendrite resonates was illustrated informally by LaBerge and his daughter, Anne La Berge in three performances of a work entitled Resonant Dendrites, (2006, 2007, 2009), which featured film, narrative voice samples and music.
A formal description of a theory of electric resonance in apical dendrites appeared in an article by Kasevich & LaBerge (2010), which shows how an apical dendrite can fine tune its own membrane oscillations to a specific peak frequency, and narrow the width of the resonance curve around this peak to less than 1 Hz. This refinement enables its associated cortical circuit to generate a specific resonant ("carrier") frequency by which the circuit can separate its signaling from that of other circuits.
A more recent article by LaBerge & Kasevich (2013) describes signaling by neurons as the neural correlate of objective information processing and resonating in clusters of apical dendrites as the neural correlate of subjective impressions (e.g., impressions of sounds, colors, and feelings). These two "articles provide theoretical support for the hypothesis that apical dendrite resonance supplements neural signaling as a major mode of neural function. Furthermore, the resonance-based subjective impressions may be regarded as the contents of consciousness.

Life 
His major extracurricular activity was to serve for 21 years as music director and Conductor of the Minnesota Bach Society Orchestra and Chorus from 1959 to 1980. He was the director of the 50-voice South Sound Classical Choir in the Tacoma, WA area until May 2019.

He resides in Tacoma, Washington with his wife Janice Lawry.

References
Estes, W.K. & Burke, C. J. A theory of stimulus variability in learning. Psychological Review, 1953, 60, 276–286.

LaBerge, D. (1959a). Effect of preliminary trials on rate of conditioning in a simple prediction situation. Journal of Experimental Psychology, 57, 20–24.

LaBerge, D. (1959b). A model with neutral elements. In R.R. Bush & W.K. Estes (Eds.), Studies in Mathematical Learning Theory. Stanford: Stanford University Press, pp 53–93.

LaBerge, D. (1962). A recruitment theory of simple behavior. Psychometrika, 27, 375–396.

LaBerge, D. and Tweedy, J.R. (1964). Presentation probability and choice time. Journal of Experimental Psychology, 68, 477–481.

LaBerge, D. Tweedy, J.R., & Ricker, J. (1967). Selective attention: Incentive variables and choice time. Psychonomic Science, 8, 341–342.

LaBerge, D., Van Gelder, P., & Yellott, J. (1970) A cueing technique in choice reaction time. Perception and Psychophysics, 7, 57–62.

LaBerge, D. (1973a) Attention and the measurement of perceptual learning. Memory and Cognition, 1, 268–276.

LaBerge, D. and Samuels, S.J. (1974) Toward a theory of automatic information processing in reading. Cognitive Psychology, 6, 293–323.

LaBerge, D. (1975). Acquisition of automatic processing of perceptual learning. In P. M. A. Rabbitt & S. Dornic (Eds.), Attention & Performance V, New York: Academic Press, pp 50–64.

LaBerge, D. (1973b) Identification of the time to switch attention: A test of a serial and a parallel model of attention. In S. Kornblum (Ed.), Attention & Performance IV, New York: Academic Press, pp 71–85.

LaBerge, D. (1983). The spatial extent of attention to letters and words. Journal of Experimental Psychology: Human Perception & Performance, 9, 37 -379.

LaBerge, D. & Brown, V. (1989) Theory of attentional operations in shape identification. Psychological Review, 96,101-124.

LaBerge, D & Buchsbaum, M.S. (1990). Positron emission tomographic measurements of pulvinar activity during an attention task. Journal of Neuroscience, 10, 613–619.

LaBerge, D., Carter, M., and Brown, V. (1992). A network simulation of thalamic circuit operations in selective attention. Neural Computation, 4, 318–331.

LaBerge, D. (1994) Quantitative models of attention and response processes in shape identification tasks. Journal of Mathematical Psychology, 38, 198–243.

LaBerge, D. (1995). Attentional Processing: The Brain's Art of Mindfulness. Cambridge, MA: Harvard University Press.

LaBerge, D. (1997). Attention, awareness, and the triangular circuit. Consciousness and Cognition, 6,140-181.

LaBerge, D., Carlson, R.L., Williams, J.K., & Bunney, B. (1997). Shifting Attention in space: Tests of moving spotlight models vs an activity-distribution model. Journal of Experimental Psychology: Human Perception and Performance. 23, 1380–1392.

LaBerge, D., Auclair, L., and Sieroff, E. (2000). Preparatory attention: experiment and theory. Consciousness and Cognition, 9, 396–434.

Sieroff, E., Piquard, A., Auclair, L., Lacomblez, L., Derouesne, C., and LaBerge, D. (2004). Deficit of preparatory attention in frontal- temporal dementia. Brain & Cognition, 55, 444–451.

Auclair, L., Jambaque, I., Dulac, O., and LaBerge, D. (2005). Deficit of preparatory attention in children with frontal lobe epilepsy. Neuropsychologia, 43, 1701–1712.

LaBerge, D. (2001). Attention, consciousness, and electrical wave activity within the cortical column. International Journal of Psychophysiology, 43, 5-24.

LaBerge, D. (2002). Attentional control: brief and prolonged. Psychological Research, 66, 220–233.

LaBerge, D. (2005). Sustained attention and apical dendrite activity in recurrent circuits. Brain Research Reviews, 50, 86–99.

LaBerge, D. (2006). Apical dendrite activity in cognition and consciousness. Consciousness and Cognition, 15, 235–257.

LaBerge, A., (2006). Resonant Dendrites: A science and art lecture/performance for soloist, video, and Max/MSP. Close Encounters, the 4th European conference of the Society for Science, Literature, and the Arts. Amsterdam.

LaBerge, A., and LaBerge, D. (2007). Resonant Dendrites. Lecture/performance at the Spark Festival of Electronic Music and Arts. University of Minnesota School of Music.

LaBerge, D. and Kasevich, R.S. (2007). The apical dendrite theory of consciousness, Neural Networks, 20,1004-1020.

LaBerge, A. (2009). Resonant Dendrites: Music for flute and computer. Claire Trevor School of the Arts, University of California, Irvine.

Kasevich, R.S., and LaBerge, D. (2011). Theory of electric resonance in the neocortical apical dendrite. PLoS ONE, 6(8): e23412.

LaBerge, D. and Kasevich, R. (2013). The cognitive significance of the resonating neurons in the cerebral cortex.  Consciousness and Cognition, 22, 1523–1550.

LaBerge, D. and Kasevich, R.S. (2017). Neuroelectric Tuning of Cortical Oscillations by Apical Dendrites in Loop Circuits. doi: 10.3389/fnsys.2017.00037.

LaBerge, D.( 2020).  The neural foundation of experience: the role of vibrating neurons. Dorrance Publishing Co. (2020).

External links 
 David LaBerge
 Apical Dendrite Function

Neuropsychologists
Living people
1929 births
People from St. Louis
Bard College at Simon's Rock faculty
College of Wooster alumni
Claremont Graduate University alumni
Stanford University alumni